The Nancy Grace Roman Space Telescope (shortened as Roman or the Roman Space Telescope, and formerly the Wide-Field Infrared Survey Telescope or WFIRST) is a NASA infrared space telescope in development and scheduled to launch by May 2027. Roman was recommended in 2010 by the United States National Research Council Decadal Survey committee as the top priority for the next decade of astronomy. On 17 February 2016, WFIRST was approved for development and launch.

The Wide-Field Instrument (WFI) is a 300.8-megapixel multi-band visible and near-infrared camera, providing a sharpness of images comparable to that achieved by the Hubble Space Telescope over a 0.28 square degree field of view, 100 times larger than imaging cameras on the Hubble. The Coronagraphic Instrument (CGI) is a high-contrast, small field of view camera and spectrometer covering visible and near-infrared wavelengths using novel starlight-suppression technology.

Stated objectives include a search for extra-solar planets using gravitational microlensing, along with probing the chronology of the universe and growth of cosmic structure, with the end goal of measuring the effects of dark energy, the consistency of general relativity, and the curvature of spacetime.

On 20 May 2020, NASA Administrator Jim Bridenstine announced that the mission would be named the Nancy Grace Roman Space Telescope in recognition of the former NASA Chief of Astronomy's role in the field of astronomy. On 29 September 2021, NASA announced that Roman had passed its Critical Design Review (CDR), and that with predicted impacts from COVID-19 disruptions, the launch date would be no later than May 2027.

As of July 2022, Roman is scheduled to be launched on a Falcon Heavy launch vehicle under a contract specifying readiness by October 2026 in support of a NASA launch commitment of May 2027.

Development of mission 

The original design of Roman, called WFIRST Design Reference Mission 1, was studied in 2011–2012, featuring a  diameter unobstructed three-mirror anastigmat telescope. It contained a single instrument, a visible to near-infrared imager/slitless prism spectrometer.

In 2012, another possibility emerged: NASA could use a second-hand National Reconnaissance Office (NRO) telescope made by Harris Corporation to accomplish a mission like the one planned for Roman. NRO offered to donate two telescopes, the same size as the Hubble Space Telescope but with a shorter focal length and hence a wider field of view. This provided important political momentum to the project, even though the telescope represents only a modest fraction of the cost of the mission and the boundary conditions from the NRO design may push the total cost over that of a fresh design. This mission concept, called WFIRST-AFTA (Astrophysics Focused Telescope Assets), was matured by a scientific and technical team; this mission is now the only present NASA plan for the use of the NRO telescopes. The Roman baseline design includes a coronagraph to enable the direct imaging of exoplanets.

Several implementations of WFIRST/Roman were studied. These included the Joint Dark Energy Mission-Omega configuration, an Interim Design Reference Mission featuring a  telescope, Design Reference Mission 1 with a 1.3 m telescope, Design Reference Mission 2, with a  telescope, and several iterations of the AFTA  configuration. In the 2015 "Final" report, Roman was considered for both geosynchronous and L2 orbits. L2 has disadvantages versus geosynchronous orbit in available data rate and propellant required, but advantages for improved observing constraints, better thermal stability, and more benign radiation environment. Some science cases (such as exoplanet microlensing parallax) are improved at L2, but the possibility of robotic servicing at either of the locations is currently unknown. By Feb 2016 it had been decided to use a halo orbit around L2.

The project is led by a team at NASA's Goddard Space Flight Center in Greenbelt, Maryland. On 30 November 2018, NASA announced it had awarded a contract for the telescope. This was for a part called the Optical Telescope Assembly or OTA, and runs to 2025. This is in conjunction with the Goddard Space Flight Center for which the OTA is planned for delivery as part of this contract.

A February 2019 description of the mission's capabilities is available in a white paper issued by members of the Roman team.

Science objectives 

The science objectives of Roman aim to address cutting-edge questions in cosmology and exoplanet research, including:

 Answering basic questions about dark energy, complementary to the European Space Agency (ESA) Euclid mission, and including: Is cosmic acceleration caused by a new energy component or by the breakdown of general relativity on cosmological scales? If the cause is a new energy component, is its energy density constant in space and time, or has it evolved over the history of the universe? Roman will use three independent techniques to probe dark energy: baryon acoustic oscillations, observations of distant supernovae, weak gravitational lensing.
 Completing a census of exoplanets to help answer new questions about the potential for life in the universe: How common are solar systems like our own? What kinds of planets exist in the cold, outer regions of planetary systems? – What determines the habitability of Earth-like worlds? This census makes use of a technique that can find exoplanets down to a mass only a few times that of the Moon: gravitational microlensing. The census would include also a sample of free-floating planets with masses likely down to the mass of Mars.
 Establishing a guest investigator mode, enabling survey investigations to answer diverse questions about our galaxy and the universe.
 Providing a coronagraph for exoplanet direct imaging that will provide the first direct images and spectra of planets around our nearest neighbors similar to our own giant planets.

Instruments
The telescope is to carry two instruments.

WFI The Wide-Field Instrument (WFI) is a 300.8-megapixel camera providing multi-band visible to near-infrared (0.48 to 2.30 µm) imaging using one wideband and six narrowband filters. A HgCdTe-based focal-plane array captures a 0.28 square degree field of view with a pixel scale of 110 milliarcseconds. The detector array is composed of 18 H4RG-10 detectors provided by Teledyne. It also carries both high-dispersion grism and low-dispersion prism assemblies for wide-field slitless spectroscopy. 

CGI The Coronagraphic Instrument (CGI) is a high contrast coronagraph covering shorter wavelengths (575 nm to 825 nm) using dual deformable mirror starlight-suppression technology. It is intended to achieve a part-per-billion suppression of starlight to enable the detection and spectroscopy of planets with a visual separation of as little as 0.15 arcseconds from their host stars.

History
The design of the Roman Space Telescope has heritage to various proposed designs for the Joint Dark Energy Mission (JDEM) between NASA and the Department of Energy (DOE). Roman adds some extra capabilities to the original JDEM proposals, including a search for extra-solar planets using gravitational microlensing. In its present incarnation (2015), a large fraction of its primary mission will be focused on probing the expansion history of the Universe and the growth of cosmic structure with multiple methods in overlapping redshift ranges, with the goal of precisely measuring the effects of dark energy, the consistency of general relativity, and the curvature of spacetime.

On 2 March 2020, NASA announced that it had approved WFIRST to proceed to implementation, with an expected development cost of US$3.2 billion and a maximum total cost of US$3.934 billion, including the coronagraph and five years of mission science operations.

On 20 May 2020, NASA Administrator Jim Bridenstine announced that the mission would be named the Nancy Grace Roman Space Telescope in recognition of the former NASA Chief of Astronomy's role in the field of astronomy.

On 31 March 2021, the NASA Office of Inspector General (OIG) released a report that stated that the development of the Nancy Grace Roman Space Telescope had been affected by the COVID-19 pandemic, which hit the US during a particularly important time in the telescope's development. NASA is expecting a total impact of US$400 million due to the pandemic and its effect on sub-contractors for the project. On 29 September 2021, NASA announced that Roman had passed its Critical Design Review (CDR), and that with predicted impacts from COVID-19 disruptions the launch date would be no later than May 2027.

On 19 July 2022, NASA announced that Roman would be launched on a Falcon Heavy launch vehicle with a contract specifying readiness by October 2026 and a launch cost of approximately $255 million.

Funding history and status 

In the fiscal year 2014, Congress provided US$56 million for Roman, and in 2015 Congress provided US$50 million. The fiscal year 2016 spending bill provided US$90 million for Roman, far above NASA's request of US$14 million, allowing the mission to enter the "formulation phase" in February 2016. On 18 February 2016, NASA announced that Roman had formally become a project (as opposed to a study), meaning that the agency intends to carry out the mission as baselined; at that time, the "AFTA" portion of the name was dropped as only that approach is being pursued. Roman is on a plan for a mid-2020s launch. The total cost of Roman at that point was expected at more than US$2 billion; NASA's 2015 budget estimate was around US$2.0 billion in 2010 dollars, which corresponds to around US$2.7 billion in real year (inflation-adjusted) dollars. 

In April 2017, NASA commissioned an independent review of the project to ensure that the mission scope and cost were understood and aligned. The review acknowledged that Roman offers "groundbreaking and unprecedented survey capabilities for dark energy, exoplanet, and general astrophysics", but directed the mission to "reduce cost and complexity sufficient to have a cost estimate consistent with the US$3.2 billion cost target set at the beginning of Phase B". NASA announced (Jan 2018) the reductions taken in response to this recommendation, and that Roman would proceed to its mission design review in February 2018 and begin Phase B by April 2018. NASA confirmed (March 2018) that the changes made to the project had reduced its estimated life cycle cost to US$3.2 billion and that the Phase B decision was on track to  begin on 11 April 2018.

In Feb 2018, the Trump administration's proposed a FY2019 budget that would have delayed the funding of the Roman (then called WFIRST), citing higher priorities within NASA and the increasing cost of this telescope. The proposed defunding of the project was met with criticism by professional astronomers, who noted that the American astronomical community had rated Roman the highest-priority space mission for the 2020s in the 2010 Decadal Survey. The American Astronomical Society expressed "grave concern" about the proposed defunding, and noted that the estimated lifecycle cost for Roman had not changed over the previous two years. However, on 22-23 March 2018, Congress approved a FY18 Roman budget in excess of the administration's budget request for that year and stated that Congress "rejects the cancellation of scientific priorities recommended by the National Academy of Sciences decadal survey process", and further directed NASA to develop new estimates of Roman's total and annual development costs. Later, the President announced he had signed the bill on 23 March 2018. NASA was funded via a FY2019 appropriations bill on February 15, 2019, with US$312 million for Roman, rejecting the President's reduced Budget Request and reasserting the desire for completion of Roman with a planning budget of US$3.2 billion.

In March 2019, again the Trump administration proposed to defund the Roman (then called WFIRST) in its FY2020 budget proposal to Congress. In testimony on 27 March 2019, NASA Administrator Jim Bridenstine hinted that NASA would continue Roman after the James Webb Space Telescope, stating "WFIRST will be a critical mission when James Webb is on orbit". In a 26 March 2019, presentation to the National Academies' Committee on Astronomy and Astrophysics, NASA Astrophysics Division Director Paul L. Hertz stated that Roman "is maintaining its US$3.2 billion cost for now... We need US$542 million in FY2020 to stay on track". At that time, it was stated that Roman would hold its Preliminary Design Review (PDR) for the overall mission in October 2019 followed by a formal mission confirmation in early 2020.

NASA announced the completion of the Preliminary Design Review (PDR) on 1 November 2019, but warned that though the mission remained on track for a 2025 launch date, shortfalls in the Senate's FY2020 budget proposal for Roman threatened to delay it further.

On 2 March 2020, NASA announced that it had approved WFIRST to proceed to implementation, with an expected development cost of US$3.2 billion and a maximum total cost of US$3.934 billion, including the coronagraph and five years of mission science operations.

On 29 September 2021, NASA announced that Roman had successfully passed its Critical Design Review (CDR), and that with flight hardware fabrication completed by 2024 followed by mission integration, the launch date would be no later than May 2027.

Institutions, partnerships, and contracts 

The Roman project office is located at NASA's Goddard Space Flight Center in Greenbelt, Maryland, and holds responsibility for overall project management. GSFC also leads the development of the Wide-Field Instrument, the spacecraft, and the telescope. The Coronagraphic Instrument is being developed at NASA's Jet Propulsion Laboratory in Pasadena, California. Science support activities for Roman are shared among Space Telescope Science Institute (Baltimore, Maryland), which is the Science Operations Center; the Infrared Processing and Analysis Center, Pasadena, California; and GSFC.

Partners 
Four international space agencies, namely the French space agency CNES, German Aerospace Center (DLR), European Space Agency (ESA), and Japan Aerospace Exploration Agency (JAXA) are (in 2019) in discussion with NASA to provide various components and science support for Roman. In 2016 NASA expressed interest in ESA contributions to the spacecraft, coronagraph and ground station support. For the coronagraph instrument, contributions from Europe and Japan are being discussed. 

In 2018 a contribution from Germany's Max Planck Institute for Astronomy was under consideration, namely the filter wheels for the star-blocking mask inside the coronagraph. In 2016 the Japanese space agency JAXA proposed to add a polarization module for the coronagraph, plus a polarization compensator. An accurate polarimetry capability on Roman may strengthen the science case for exoplanets and planetary disks, which shows polarization. 

In addition to these potential partnerships, Australia offered ground station contributions for the mission.

Construction contracts 
In May 2018, NASA awarded a multi-year contract to Ball Aerospace to provide key components (the WFI Opto-Mechanical Assembly) for the Wide-Field Instrument on Roman. In June 2018, NASA awarded a contract to Teledyne Scientific and Imaging to provide the infrared detectors for the Wide-Field Instrument. On 30 November 2018, NASA announced it had awarded the contract for Optical Telescope Assembly to the Harris Corporation of Rochester, New York.

See also

References

External links 

 Roman page at Goddard Space Flight Center site
 Roman Science Data Center page at the Infrared Processing and Analysis Center (IPAC)
 US$1.6 Billion Telescope Would Search Alien Planets and Probe Dark Energy – Space.com
 The WFIRST/AFTA astrophysics mission: bigger and better for exoplanets , Tom Greene
 
   30 May 2014
   16 March 2015
   18 February 2016

Infrared telescopes
Space telescopes
Future spaceflights
Proposed NASA space probes
NASA programs
Exoplanet search projects
Goddard Space Flight Center
2026 in spaceflight
Dark energy